Luanda International Jazz Festival, also known as Luanda Jazz Fest, is a jazz festival held annually since 2009 in Luanda, Angola.

Background
Held at the Cine Atlantico in late July and early August, the fairly young festival has attracted legendary musicians such as McCoy Tyner, Gary Bartz, George Benson, Dee Dee Bridgewater, Cassandra Wilson, Joe Sample, Randy Crawford, Abdullah Ibrahim, Manu Dibango and the Yellowjackets. It has also featured notable Angolan musicians such as Ricardo Lemvo, Afrikkanitha, Sandra Corderio, Dodo Miranda, Simmons Massini and Toto and Mozambican born guitarist Jimmy Dludlu.

See also
List of festivals in Angola
List of jazz festivals

References

External links
Official site (in Portuguese)

Jazz festivals in Angola
Luanda
2009 establishments in Angola
Annual events in Angola
Music festivals established in 2009
Music festivals in Angola
Festivals in Angola